The following outline is provided as an overview of and topical guide to Sikkim:

Sikkim – landlocked state of India, the last to give up its monarchy and fully integrate into India, in 1975. With 607,688 inhabitants as of the 2011 census, Sikkim is the least populous state in India and the second-smallest state after Goa in total area, covering approximately 7,096 km2 (2,740 sq mi). Sikkim is nonetheless geographically diverse due to its location in the Himalayas; the climate ranges from subtropical to high alpine, and Kangchenjunga, the world's third-highest peak, is located on Sikkim's border with Nepal.

General reference

Names 
 Common English name: Sikkim
 Pronunciation: 
 Official English name(s): Sikkim
 Nicknames
 Su Khyim, Denjong, Beyul Demazong, Nye-mae-el, Indrakil
 Adjectivals
  Sikkimese
 Demonyms
 Sikkimese
 Abbreviations and name codes
 ISO 3166-2 code:  IND-SK
 Vehicle registration code: SK

Rankings (amongst India's states) 

 by population: 29th
 by area (2011 census): 28th
 by crime rate (2015): 
 by gross domestic product (GDP) (2014): 28th
by Human Development Index (HDI): 
by life expectancy at birth: 
by literacy rate:

Geography of Sikkim 

Geography of Sikkim
 Sikkim is: an Indian state
 Population of Sikkim: 
 Area of Sikkim:  
 Atlas of Sikkim

Location of Sikkim 
 Sikkim is situated within the following regions:
 Northern Hemisphere
 Eastern Hemisphere
 Eurasia
 Asia
 South Asia
 India
 Northeast India
 Time zone:  Indian Standard Time (UTC+05:30)

Environment of Sikkim

Natural geographic features of Sikkim

Regions of Sikkim

Ecoregions of Sikkim

Administrative divisions of Sikkim

Districts of Sikkim 

 Districts of Sikkim
 Gangtok
 Pakyong
 Soreng
 Namchi
 Gyalshing
 Mangan

Municipalities of Sikkim 

Municipalities of Sikkim

 Capital of Sikkim: Capital of Sikkim
 Cities of Sikkim

Demography of Sikkim 

Demographics of Sikkim

Government and politics of Sikkim 

Politics of Sikkim

 Form of government: Indian state government (parliamentary system of representative democracy)
 Capital of Sikkim: Capital of Sikkim
 Elections in Sikkim

Union government in Sikkim 
 Rajya Sabha members from Sikkim
 Sikkim Pradesh Congress Committee
 Indian general election, 2009 (Sikkim)

Branches of the government of Sikkim 

Government of Sikkim

Executive branch of the government of Sikkim 

 Head of state: Governor of Sikkim
 Head of government: Chief Minister of Sikkim

Legislative branch of the government of Sikkim 

Sikkim Legislative Assembly

Judicial branch of the government of Sikkim

Law and order in Sikkim 

 Law enforcement in Sikkim
 Sikkim Police

History of Sikkim 

History of Sikkim

History of Sikkim, by period

Prehistoric Sikkim

Ancient Sikkim

Medieval Sikkim

Colonial Sikkim

Contemporary Sikkim

History of Sikkim, by region

History of Sikkim, by subject

Culture of Sikkim 

 Cuisine of Sikkim
 Languages of Sikkim
 Monuments in Sikkim
 Monuments of National Importance in Sikkim
 State Protected Monuments in Sikkim
 World Heritage Sites in Sikkim

Art in Sikkim 

 Music of Sikkim

People of Sikkim 

People of Sikkim
 List of chief ministers of Sikkim

Religion in Sikkim 

Religion in Sikkim
 Christianity in Sikkim
 Hinduism in Sikkim

Sports in Sikkim 

Sports in Sikkim
 Cricket in Sikkim
 Sikkim Cricket Association
 Football in Sikkim
 Sikkim Football Association
 Sikkim football team

Symbols of Sikkim 

Symbols of Sikkim
 State mammal: Red panda
 State bird: Blood pheasant
 State flower: Noble orchid 
 State seal: Seal of Sikkim
 State tree: Rhododendron

Economy and infrastructure of Sikkim 

 Tourism in Sikkim

Education in Sikkim 

Education in Sikkim
 Institutions of higher education in Sikkim

Health in Sikkim 

Health in Sikkim

See also 

 Outline of India

References

External links 

 
 "Buddhist Monasteries of Sikkim". Sikkim.nic.in.
 
 
 Sikkim
 SIKKIM ORGANIC MISSION

Sikkim
Sikkim
 1